Benge is an English surname. Notable people with this name include:

 Alfreda Benge (born 1940), British lyricist and illustrator
 Bob Benge (1762–1794), American Indian leader
 Chris Benge (born 1962), American politician
 Elden Benge (1904–1960), American trumpet player and maker
 Fred Benge, New Zealand association football player
 Harvey Benge, New Zealand photographer
 Howard Benge (1913–1986), New Zealand rower
 Ray Benge (1902–1997), American baseball player
 Wilson Benge (1875–1955), English actor

Fictional characters 
 Connie Benge, a fictional character on the American animated sitcom Doug

See also

References 

English-language surnames